Siavash Ghomayshi (born 11 June 1945, Ahvaz) is an Iranian musician, singer and song writer. Siavash studied music in London where he got his master's degree. He left Iran in 1978 and now lives in Los Angeles. Over the past four decades, he composed songs for artists like Ebi, Moein, Googoosh, Aref, Mansour, Leila Forouhar, Shohreh Solati and others.

Biography

Siavash Ghomayshi was born in Ahvaz, Iran on 11 June 1945. He started his career as a composer when he was just 12. Siavash holds a master's degree in classical jazz from Royal Society of Arts in London, England, where he majored in pop music. He worked with some popular bands in England such as the Avengers and the Insects as lead guitarist and lead singer. When he returned to Iran at the age of 25, he started his career mainly as a composer. Ghomayshi has created numerous melodies and lyrics for famous Persian artists. Ghomayshi wrote his first song, called "Ghayeghran" ("Boatman") for Zia when he was only 13 old years. Although initially considered a composer, in the latter years he released his first single "Farangis", and has since continued his work as a singer, composer, arranger, and lyricist. He lived in Iran until the age of 33, then decided to leave the country once again to pursue his career in the United States.

In recent years Siavash Ghomayshi has explored electronic music as well such experimentation has introduced new elements into his music and the whole Iranian pop music. He is known as the father of trance music in Iran. Among the 17 albums Ghomayshi has recorded to date, Ragbaar, Rooz-haye Bi-Khatereh (Days with No Memories), Bi Sarzamin-tar az Baad (More Homeless Than The Wind), Taak (The Vine), and last but certainly not the least Yadegari ("Memento") (2011) have been among his most successful. Because of the popularity of Siavash's voice among young generation, in recent years many singers have followed his style.

Although his albums may be considered largely non-political, he expresses a longing for his home country. Ghomayshi has also had significant involvement in albums released by various musical compatriots, "The Story of Yours, The Story of Mine", "Setarehaye Sorbi (1995) and Shab-e-Niloufari (2003)", which attracted a lot of attention with great reviews. His music can be considered as Persian-language pop/rock, in contrast to the vocal stylings most often associated with adult contemporary singers.

In 2011 in an interview with teamghomayshi.com he stated that Yadegari ("Memento") (2011) would most probably be his last album, However, till present day, his last album is "Sargozasht (2017)" that contains 9 songs; but to let his fans enjoy his music and his unique style, he will be releasing singles.

Discography

Albums 
 Farangis (1989)
 Khabe Baroon(Farangis) ("Dreaming of the Rain") (1991)
 Hekayat ("Anecdote") (1992)
 Taak ("Vine") (1993)
 Ghesseye Golo Tagarg ("The Story of the Flower and the Hailstone") (1994)
 Shahre Khorshid ("City of the Sun") (1995) (Instrumental)
 Havaye Khooneh ("Nostalgic") (1996)
 Ghessehye Amir ("Story of the Prince") Or ("Amir's Story") (1996)
 Ghabe Shishei ("Glass Frame") (1998)
 Shokoofehaye Kaviri ("Blossoms of the Desert") (2000)
 Hadeseh ("Incident") (2001)
 Neghab ("Mask") (2002)
 Bi Sarzamin Tar Az Baad ("Landless Like The Wind") (2003)
 Roozhaye Bi Khatereh ("Days with No Memories") (2005)
 Ghoroub Ta Tolou ("Sunset to Sunrise") (2006) (Remix)
 Ragbaar ("Rain Shower") (2008)
Yadegari ("Souvenir") (2011)
Sarghozasht ("History") (2017)

Singles 
 Rafigh Single (Buddy) (2009)
 Baazi Single ("The Game") (2011)
 Tekrar Single ("Repeat") (2012)
 Parvaz Single ("Flight") (2012)
 Parandeh Ft Moein Single ("Bird") (2013)
 Navazesh Single ("Caress") (2013)
 Tardid Single ("Doubt") (2014)
 Ayandeh Single ("Future") (2014)
 Mohabat Single ("Kindness") (2014)
 Tehran Single ("Tehran City") (2014)
 Pooch Single ("Null") (2015)
 Goli Jan Single ("Dear Goli") (2015)
 Hasrat Single ("Envy") (2015)
 Masir Single ("Path") (2015)
 Khastegia Single ("Tireness") (2016)
 Javooneh Single   ("Sapling") (2016)
 Ahvaz Single ("Ahvaz City") (2017)
 40 Saal Single "Ft.Googoosh" ("40 Years") (2018)
 Ashegh Single ("Lover") (2019)
 Bebakhsh Single ("Forgive") (2019)
 Sarnevesht 2 Single ("Fate") (2020)
Gozasht Single ("Forgiveness") (2021)
Marham Single (2021)
ُSafar Single (2022)
Khazoon Single ("Autumn") (2022)
Barax Single ("Contrariwise") (2022)
Mojeze Single ("The Miracle") (2022)

References

 Biography.pdf

External links
 Siavash Ghomayshi's official website

1945 births
Living people
Iranian pianists
People from Ahvaz
Iranian composers
Iranian pop singers
Iranian rock singers
Iranian male singers
Iranian rock musicians
Caltex Records artists
Taraneh Records artists
Iranian music arrangers
Persian-language singers
Alborz High School alumni
Iranian singer-songwriters
20th-century Iranian male singers
21st-century Iranian male singers